Jack Michael Antonoff (born March 31, 1984) is an American singer, multi-instrumentalist, songwriter, and record producer. Antonoff is the lead singer of rock band Bleachers, and is the guitarist and drummer in the pop rock band Fun. He was previously the lead singer of the indie rock band Steel Train. Aside from his work with Bleachers and Fun, Antonoff has worked as a songwriter and record producer with various artists, including Taylor Swift, the 1975, Lorde, St. Vincent, Florence and the Machine, Lana Del Rey, Fifth Harmony, Kevin Abstract, Carly Rae Jepsen, the Chicks, Tegan and Sara and Clairo. Antonoff has often been credited with having a significant impact on the sound of contemporary popular music.

Antonoff has been nominated for a Golden Globe Award and won eight Grammy Awards, including the 2022 and 2023 Grammy for Producer of the Year. He has also won Grammy Awards for his work with Fun, for production on Swift's albums 1989 and Folklore, for production on St. Vincent's album Daddy’s Home, and for co-writing the title track on St. Vincent's Masseduction.

Early life
Antonoff was born on March 31, 1984, in Bergenfield, New Jersey. He is the second of three children of Shira (Wall) and Rick Antonoff. He is the younger brother of fashion designer Rachel Antonoff. His younger sister, Sarah, died of brain cancer at the age of 13 when Antonoff was a senior in high school. The event had a profound effect on Antonoff who has said "... my whole career has been revisiting that through a different lens."

Antonoff is Jewish. He grew up in New Milford, New Jersey, and Woodcliff Lake, New Jersey, and attended elementary school at the Solomon Schechter Day School of Bergen County. For high school, he and his sister commuted to Manhattan to attend the Professional Children's School.

During his sophomore year of high school, in November 1998, he and several friends from elementary school formed a punk rock band called Outline. They released a self-titled EP through Lifetime Records, a friend's record label, in January 2000. Antonoff initially sang in the group until early 2000 when Eddie Wright took over on vocals. With the addition of Wright, they recorded six songs which were later released as 6 Song Demo in the summer. They released an album, A Boy Can Dream, in July 2001 through Triple Crown Records. When they were 15, Antonoff and his Outline bandmate used a DIY guide to book shows in numerous states, including Florida and Texas, and borrowed Antonoff's parents' minivan to travel in. During the tour, Outline played in venues such as anarchist bookstores, while the oldest member of the band drove because he was 18 years old. Antonoff explained in 2014: "Half the time no one would show up or the equipment would be too fucked up to play ... but that's when I fell in love with touring." The band lasted until 2002.

Music career

Steel Train
In 2002, Antonoff and friend, Scott Irby-Ranniar, formed the band Steel Train—Antonoff was the lead singer, and they recruited drummer Matthias Gruber. The band then convinced two of their friends from the band Random Task, Evan Winiker and Matthew Goldman, to drop out of college to join the new band. Steel Train secured a recording deal with Drive-Thru Records. The group was popular on the jamband festival circuit and Antonoff has said he has applied that grassroots mentality to his future projects.

Fun.
In 2008, Nate Ruess (formerly the frontman of the Format) asked Antonoff to join him and Andrew Dost (formerly of Anathallo) in a new band, which became Fun. Antonoff was already well acquainted with Ruess and Dost, as their former bands had all toured together. The new band released its debut album, Aim and Ignite, in 2009. Fun's second album, Some Nights (2012), produced the band's first number-one hit single, "We Are Young" (featuring Janelle Monae). The song was co-written by Antonoff with Ruess, Dost, and Jeff Bhasker. Fun. then played with their musical heroes Queen in September 2013 at the iHeartRadio Music Festival, which was held at the MGM Grand Garden Arena in Las Vegas, Nevada. Antonoff played Brian May's guitar during the rehearsal, which he described as the "most surreal experience ever." The band then released a free six-song EP in December 2013, titled Before Shane Went to Bangkok: Fun. Live in the USA.

Bleachers

Antonoff announced a solo project called Bleachers in February 2014. Antonoff stated in June 2014 that the project had been a consideration for around 10 years, and the name was inspired by the "disconnected, darker side" of suburban youth and John Hughes movies, which were "tied to a time when big songs were great songs." The songs for the debut Bleachers album were mostly written on Antonoff's laptop computer in hotel rooms during a Fun. world tour.

The Huffington Post published a positive review of Bleachers' first single, "I Wanna Get Better"—released on February 18—calling it the "catchiest song of 2014," while Time proclaimed, "[Bleachers] is more fun than Fun." Antonoff revealed the intent behind the debut single in a Rolling Stone interview:

Antonoff explained to Rolling Stone that, while the song might sound joyous, "it's very desperate" and, like many of the other songs on the album is about loss. Antonoff worked with producers John Hill and Vince Clarke on the Bleachers studio album, as he sought to create "massive, beautiful pop songs that sound fuckin' cool." The completed album, Strange Desire, was released in July 2014, and "I Wanna Get Better" peaked at number one on the U.S. Alternative charts during the same week. In regard to Strange Desire, Antonoff said:

"I Wanna Get Better" was eventually named number 18 in Rolling Stones 50 Best Songs of 2014, with the publication describing the song as "therapy rock" that is "as fun as it is cathartic". Antonoff released Bleachers' second album Gone Now on June 2, 2017. Its lead single "Don't Take the Money" peaked at number 2 on Alternative Radio.

Taylor Swift
In 2013, Antonoff wrote and produced the song "Sweeter than Fiction" with American singer-songwriter Taylor Swift, for the film One Chance. The song was written in Antonoff's New York City apartment after he and Swift shared a love of a particular snare drum sound from a Fine Young Cannibals song. They brainstormed ideas by email before starting the songwriting process.

Swift and Antonoff wrote and produced three songs together on Swift's fifth studio album, 1989, including the singles "Out of the Woods", "I Wish You Would", and the bonus track "You Are in Love". 1989 was released in October 2014 and became the biggest-selling album in the U.S. that year. On the deluxe version of the album, Swift explains in a voice memo that the song "I Wish You Would" originated from a guitar track that Antonoff had recorded on his smartphone. After Swift first heard it, she asked Antonoff if she could develop the idea further, and it eventually became an album track. The album won Antonoff a Grammy Award for Album of the Year in 2016.

In 2016, Swift, Antonoff, and Sam Dew wrote Swift and Zayn's song "I Don't Wanna Live Forever", with Antonoff producing, for the film Fifty Shades Darker. The track appears on the Fifty Shades Darker: Original Motion Picture Soundtrack. The duo wrote and produced the number-one single "Look What You Made Me Do" as well, which was released on August 25, 2017. Antonoff was a key contributor to Swift's sixth studio album, Reputation. Aside from "Look What You Made Me Do", Swift and Antonoff also co-wrote and co-produced five other songs on Reputation—"Getaway Car", "Dress", "This Is Why We Can't Have Nice Things", "Call It What You Want", and "New Year's Day".

In 2019, Swift and Antonoff wrote eight songs and produced eleven tracks together for Swift's seventh studio album, Lover, including the promotional single "The Archer" and the title track, which served as the album's third single.

In 2020, Swift and Antonoff worked together on Swift's eighth studio album, Folklore. Along with Aaron Dessner and Swift, Antonoff serves as one of the songwriters and producers for the record, with Antonoff helping to co-produce six songs and co-write four, including the third single, "Betty". Antonoff continued to collaborate with Swift on Folklore "sister record" and Swift's ninth studio album, Evermore, in which he co-wrote the tracks "Gold Rush" and "Ivy", and co-produced the former.

Antonoff went on working on Swift's re-recordings. In 2021, the duo produced four tracks on Fearless (Taylor's Version): "Mr. Perfectly Fine", "That's When", "Don't You", and "Bye Bye Baby". Swift and Antonoff also co-produced three tracks on Red (Taylor's Version): "Babe (Taylor's Version)", "Forever Winter", and "All Too Well (10 Minute Version)".

Antonoff co-produced Swift's 2022 album, Midnights and co-wrote eleven of the thirteen tracks. He appeared in the music video for the ninth track, "Bejeweled".

Lorde
In 2017, Antonoff co-wrote and produced Lorde's Melodrama which was released in June. USAToday described it as "the best pop album of 2017 so far". Rolling Stones praises Antonoff's production specifically, noting that he uses "empty space to spectacular effect, [as] the arrangements veer from stark clarity to delirium." In support of the album, Antonoff appeared in the music video for its lead single, "Green Light". He then performed "Liability" alongside Lorde on Saturday Night Live. The album also received a nomination for the 2018 Grammy Award for Album of the Year. Beginning from 2018 until 2021, Antonoff co-wrote, produced, and performed on Lorde's third album Solar Power.

Love, Simon
In 2018, Antonoff produced the soundtrack for the 20th Century Fox romantic comedy-drama film Love, Simon. Bleachers also contributed four songs. On working on the ground-breaking film, the first major studio picture to focus on a gay teenager, Antonoff said "I believe Love, Simon is pivotal, a major step for a new generation" and added that he was "honored" that "genius" director Greg Berlanti asked him to work on the soundtrack. He also said he was "very lucky to be a part of [Love, Simon]" and "loved every moment of making this soundtrack" after stating he was "beyond blown away" by the response to the film and soundtrack.

Red Hearse
On June 26, 2019, Antonoff previewed a new musical project with Sam Dew and Sounwave called Red Hearse. The project was teased with the release of two singles, "Red Hearse" and "Honey". On July 22, 2019, Red Hearse made their television debut on The Tonight Show Starring Jimmy Fallon, performing "Half Love". Their debut self-titled studio album was released on August 16, 2019, via RCA Records.

Lana Del Rey
He co-produced Lana Del Rey's sixth studio album Norman Fucking Rockwell!, which was released on August 30, 2019. He also co-wrote a majority of the songs on the album including the singles "Mariners Apartment Complex" and "Venice Bitch". The album received critical praise with NME's Rhian Daly noting that the "bohemian folk" sound of the record was a departure from Antonoff's "brand of crystalline euphoria." Other critics noted the album's 60s inspired, psychedelic rock sound. The album was nominated for Grammy Album of the Year and won NME Album of the Year in 2020. He also produced her seventh studio album Chemtrails Over the Country Club, released on March 19, 2021.

Shadow of the City 
In 2015, Antonoff started his own music festival called Shadow of the City. The festival takes place annually at The Stone Pony Summer Stage in Asbury Park, New Jersey. Shadow of the City is a one-day festival with only one stage, making it different from other music festivals. Money from each ticket sold is donated to The Ally Coalition, an organization founded by Antonoff and his sister Rachel. The 2018 and most recent lineup included Antonoff and his band Bleachers, Hayley Kiyoko, Julien Baker, Turnover, Beach Slang, Clams Casino, and Ex Reyes. Other past performers include Charli XCX, the 1975, Khalid, Carly Rae Jepsen, Bishop Briggs, BØRNS and more. In addition to musical performances, the festival conducts dunk tank and Mario Kart tournaments to benefit The Ally Coalition.

Other projects

Antonoff co-wrote the 2013 song "Brave" with Sara Bareilles after the two were introduced by Sara Quin of the band Tegan and Sara. Bareilles said to Billboard: "We met for breakfast one day, and I was just so enamored with him and his personality ... The first day we sat down together was the day we wrote 'Brave.'" Antonoff wrote the song about a friend's struggle to speak openly about his sexuality. The quickly written song was released on April 23, and by the end of June, "Brave" had sold 160,000 digital copies and peaked at number 61 on the Billboard Hot 100 chart. The music video for the song was viewed 1.1 million times on YouTube within a month of its release in May 2013, and by the start of 2015, had received nearly 39 million views. "Brave" was used by Microsoft to advertise its Windows tablet technology device.

In 2015, he created a Google Play docuseries titled Thank You and Sorry, which combined scripted scenes and footage from Bleachers shows. It was released in six 15-minute episodes and included cameos from Lena Dunham, Rosie Perez, Olivia Wilde, Colin Quinn, and Jason Mantzoukas. Also in 2015, Antonoff portrayed the character Baby Goya in the comedy-drama film Hello, My Name Is Doris.

In 2017, he also contributed to the production of Pink's seventh studio album, Beautiful Trauma, and produced St. Vincent's fifth studio album, Masseduction.

In early 2019, he handled production on Brockhampton frontman Kevin Abstract's solo album, Arizona Baby.

Antonoff appeared as himself in the 2021 Edgar Wright-directed film The Sparks Brothers, talking about his admiration for the band Sparks. That same year he contributed to St. Vincent's sixth studio album, Daddy's Home, and Clairo's sophomore record, Sling. He produced eight tracks off Florence and the Machine's fifth studio album, Dance Fever, released in 2022. His credits on the album include the singles "King" and "Free."

In 2022, Antonoff went on to collaborate with English alternative band the 1975 to co-produce their fifth studio album, Being Funny in a Foreign Language.

Accolades
Antonoff has received eight Grammy Awards and been nominated for one Golden Globe Award.

Golden Globe Awards
The Golden Globe Awards are awarded annually by the Hollywood Foreign Press Association to celebrate the best in film and television. Antonoff has been nominated once.

 to
|-
| 2014
| "Sweeter than Fiction"
| Best Original Song
| 
|}

Gracie Awards

|-
| 2021
| Folklore: The Long Pond Studio Sessions
| Grand Award for Special or Variety
| 
|}

Grammy Awards
The Grammy Awards are awarded annually by the National Academy of Recording Arts and Sciences of the United States. Antonoff has earned eight Grammys out of twenty nominations, including Producer of the Year, Non-Classical in 2022 and 2023.

|-
| rowspan="6" | 2013
| Fun
| Best New Artist
| 
|-
| rowspan="3" | "We Are Young"
| Record of the Year
| 
|-
| Song of the Year
| 
|-
| Best Pop Duo/Group Performance
| 
|-
| rowspan="2" | Some Nights
| Best Pop Vocal Album
| 
|-
| rowspan="3" | Album of the Year
| 
|-
|| 2016
| 1989
| 
|-
| rowspan="2" | 2018
| Melodrama
| 
|-
| "I Don't Wanna Live Forever"
| Best Song Written for Visual Media
| 
|-
| rowspan="2" | 2019
| Masseduction
| Best Alternative Music Album
| 
|-
| "Masseduction"
| Best Rock Song
| 
|-
| rowspan="3" | 2020
| Norman Fucking Rockwell!
| Album of the Year
| 
|-
| "Norman Fucking Rockwell"
| Song of the Year
| 
|-
| Himself
| Producer of the Year, Non-Classical
| 
|-
| rowspan="2" | 2021
| Folklore
| Album of the Year
| 
|-
| Himself
| Producer of the Year, Non-Classical
| 
|-
| rowspan="3" | 2022
| Evermore
| Album of the Year
| 
|-
| Daddy's Home
| Best Alternative Music Album
| 
|-
| rowspan="2" | Himself
| rowspan="2" | Producer of the Year, Non-Classical
| 
|-
| 2023
| 
|}

Satellite Awards
The Satellite Awards are annual awards given by the International Press Academy that are commonly noted in entertainment industry journals and blogs. Antonoff has been nominated twice.

|-
| 2018
| "I Don't Wanna Live Forever"
| rowspan="2" | Best Original Song
| 
|-
| 2019
| "Strawberries & Cigarettes"
| 
|}

Personal life
Antonoff dated classmate Scarlett Johansson from 2001 to 2002. When Antonoff first moved out of the family home near the end of 2012, he lived with his sister, Rachel, on the Upper West Side of New York City. Afterward, he relocated to Brooklyn Heights to live with Lena Dunham, whom he was dating at the time. The couple separated in January 2018. As of December 2019, he resides in the Brooklyn Heights apartment he shared with Dunham, containing his home music studio. Antonoff is engaged to actress Margaret Qualley.

In June 2014, Antonoff said he was "desperate" for kids, explaining:

Antonoff has spoken publicly about his struggles with depression, anxiety and obsessive–compulsive disorder. He claims that hearing of others' battles with depression made him feel "not better, but not alone" and "way less scared." As of June 2014, Antonoff was seeing both a therapist and a psychopharmacologist, while also taking anti-anxiety medications. He has germophobia which was exacerbated by a bout of pneumonia that he suffered in 2011 while recording a studio album for his band Fun. His pulmonologist prescribed a daily run, but he explained that he hates it "more than anything" because it is "one of the most truly boring experiences on Earth."

Music is central to Antonoff's life and he explained in June 2014:

Discography

Outline
 Outline (2000)
 6 Song Demo (2000)
 A Boy Can Dream (2001)

Steel Train
 For You My Dear (2003)
 Twilight Tales from the Prairies of the Sun (2005)
 Trampoline (2007)
 Steel Train Is Here (2009)
 Steel Train (2010)

Fun.
 Aim and Ignite (2009)
 Some Nights (2012)

Bleachers
 Strange Desire (2014)
 Gone Now (2017)
Take the Sadness Out of Saturday Night (2021)
Red Hearse
Red Hearse (2019)

Soundtracks
 One Chance (2013)
 Fifty Shades Darker: Original Motion Picture Soundtrack (2017)
 Love, Simon (2018)
 Minions: The Rise of Gru (2022)

As producer
 The Chicks – Gaslighter (2020)
 Clairo – Sling (2021)
 Florence and the Machine - Dance Fever (2022) 
 Lana Del Rey – Norman Fucking Rockwell! (2019), Violet Bent Backwards over the Grass (2020), Chemtrails over the Country Club (2021), Did You Know That There's a Tunnel Under Ocean Blvd (2023)
 Lorde – Melodrama (2017), Solar Power (2021)
 Kevin Abstract – Arizona Baby (2019)
 St. Vincent – Masseduction (2017), Daddy's Home (2021)
 Taylor Swift – 1989 (2014), Reputation (2017), Lover (2019), Folklore (2020), Evermore (2020), Fearless (Taylor's Version) (2021), Red (Taylor's Version) (2021), Midnights (2022)
 The 1975 – Being Funny in a Foreign Language (2022)

See also
 List of people from New Jersey
 Music of New Jersey

References

External links

 

 

Living people
1984 births
21st-century American singers
Activists from New Jersey
American indie rock musicians
American male singer-songwriters
Fun (band) members
Grammy Award winners
Jewish American musicians
Jewish rock musicians
American LGBT rights activists
People from Bergenfield, New Jersey
People from New Milford, New Jersey
People from Woodcliff Lake, New Jersey
Singer-songwriters from New Jersey
Steel Train members
APRA Award winners